Kamal Hosni  (1929–2005; Arabic:كمال حسني) was the stage name for Kamall Eldin Mohammed, an Egyptian singer and actor. Growing up he thought that the theater was his calling. He decided to leave the industry after his only film (Rabee El Hob) in 1955.

Early life 
Hosni graduated from the Faculty of Commerce and then worked for the National Bank of Egypt.

He loved and sang the songs of Mohamed Abdel Wahab, Farid al-Atrash.

Film career 
Film producer Mary Queeny selected him for the main role in Rabee El Hob. Kamal Husni was chosen as his stage name. In 1955, Hosni starred in the film with Shadia, Shoukry Sarhan and Hussain Riad. He sang "Ghali Alia", and with Shadia "Lao Salimtak Alby. Hosni then decided to retire from art. He immigrated to London to work for entrepreneurs. He returned to Egypt in the late nineties and recorded religious songs.

Personal life 
He met his wife Busanya in a bank where they were both then working. They had three sons, Nader (after Mary Queeny's son). Ahmed and Mohammed. Their two youngest sons were named after Shadya's song 'Ahmed And Mohammed Shargaloony'..

Kamal Hosni died on 1 April 2005, in Cairo.

See also 
 Lists of Egyptians
 كمال حسني

References 

20th-century Egyptian male actors
Egyptian male film actors
20th-century Egyptian male singers
1929 births
2005 deaths